The Museum of the Riverina is a local history museum in Wagga Wagga, New South Wales, Australia. The Riverina is the region in south-western New South Wales in which Wagga Wagga is located. The museum was established by Wagga Wagga and District Historical Society in 1967 (Morris, p. 241) in premises near the Wagga Wagga Botanic Gardens on Lord Baden Powell Drive.

In the late 1990s, Wagga Wagga City Council took over the operation of the museum. In 1999 the Historic Council Chambers, on the corner of Baylis and Morrow Streets, were converted into a second site for the museum following the opening of the new Wagga Wagga Civic Centre. The Historic Council Chambers site hosts travelling exhibitions while the Botanic Gardens site is home to the Sporting Hall of Fame and the museum's permanent collection, including a set of figurines from the Tichborne case.

The museum provides a regional outreach service to 38 Riverina museums.

Sporting Hall of Fame
 
The following sportspeople have been inducted into the museum's Sporting Hall of Fame:

Bain, Phillip - target shooting
Bajer, Roger - soccer
Baverstock (née Frauenfelder), Brooke - softball
Bradley, Melanie - athletics
Bragg, Thomas - indoor bias bowls
Breasley, Scobie - jockey
Brentnall, Greg - rugby league
Brwn, Cameron Wallace - athletics
Byrne, Rod - touch football
Carey, Wayne - Australian rules football
Carruthers, Simon - squash
Carter, Megan - hockey
Chisholm Lachlan - athletics
Chisholm (née Taylor), Megan - karate
Collingwood, Josh - cycling
Commens, Adam - hockey
Condron, Kevin - motorcycling
Cooke, Ken - rifle shooting
Crowe, Graham - shooting
Daniher, Terry - Australian rules football
Dawson, Tom - cycling
Doyle, Tim - kayaking
Drummond, Cheryl - carriage driving
Dwyer, Patrick - athletics
Eisenhauer, Peter - touch football, rugby league
Elkington, Steve - golf
Ellwood, Beresford - rugby union
Finch, Andrew - shooting
Fletcher, Anthony - rugby league refereeing
Foster (née Catton), Brenda - tennis
Gooden (née Wheeler), Amanda - softball
Haberl (née Campbell), Andrea - table tennis
Hadkins, Wayne - aero-modelling
Hann, Quinten - snooker
Hawick, Greg - rugby league
Henderson, Kate - diving
Henderson, Nick - rugby union
Hetherington, Morris - golf
Horne (née Robinson), Kim - softball
Housden, Robert - kayaking
House, Alyisha - athletics - Junior Sporting Hall of Fame
Hubbard, Greg - basketball
Humbert, Ashley - cycling
Jenkyn, Diane - dressage
Jones, Allison - orienteering
Kahlefeldt, Brad - triathlon
Kelly, Paul - Australian rules football
Kingston, Geoff - Australian rules football
Langford, John - rugby union
Lawson, Geoff - cricket
Lenehan, James - rugby union
Longmore, Anna & Rooke, Matthew - dancesport
Macken, Georgina - orienteering
Martin, Steve - rugby league
McDonald, Terry - motorcycling
McKee, Joyce - lawn bowls
McKinnon, Bruce - volleyball
McLay, Peter - cricket
McLennan, Graeme - hockey and indoor hockey
McMahon, Terry - touch football
McMullen, Ken - rugby union
Miller, Warren - swimming, aquathon and modern pentathlon
Moffat, Richard - cycling
Mohr, Wilbur (Bill) - Australian rules football
Mooney, Cameron - Australian rules football
Mortimer, Chris - rugby league
Mortimer, Steve - rugby league
Murphy, Jacqueline - netball
Nix, Bernard - touch football
O'Neill, Andrew - athletics
Parker, Holly - equestrian
Paul, Ann - hockey
Pieper, Gerald - Australian rules football
Pike, Stephen - referee touch football
Puckett (née Bennett), Robyn - golf
Richards, Lloyd - motorcycling
Richardson, Norma - lawn bowls
Robertson, Bill - cycling
Robertson, Bob - cycling
Roche, Tony - tennis
Rooke, Barney - shooting
Rooke, Matthew & Longmore, Anna - dancesport
Schuster (née Rooke), Maree - clay target shooting
Scott, Nola - c
Shipard, Sally - soccer, cricket
Slater, Michael - cricket
SMITH, Rex Daniel - touch football
Sterling, Peter - rugby league
Stormonth, Michael - dirt track/speedway
Summons, Arthur - rugby union, rugby league
Sunderland, Bob - motorcycle racing
Sutherland, Ben - gymnastics
Taylor, Col - aero-modelling
Taylor, Mark - cricket
Tennant, Raeleigh - triathlon
Thomas, Gilbert 'Tig' - sailing
Tonkin, Arthur - rugby union
Tutty, Bruce - shooting - pistol
Twitt, Melanie - hockey
Weissel, Eric - rugby league
Williams, Garry - sailing
Williams, Gregory - sailing
Young, Jason Carl - cricket

See also
Mobile Cook's Galley

References

 Morris, S (1999). Wagga Wagga, a history. Bobby Graham Publishers, Wagga Wagga.

External links
 Museum of the Riverina

Museums established in 1967
Museums in New South Wales
Local museums in Australia
Museum of the Riverina
Sport in Wagga Wagga
History of Wagga Wagga